Milo Mac Thady O'Connor was an Irish priest in the second half of the thirteenth century: prelates Volume 1" Cotton, H. p169 Dublin, Hodges & Smith, 1848–1878</ref> the first recorded Archdeacon of Clonmacnoise</ref> Annette Kehnel, Clonmacnois the Church and Lands of St. Ciarán:Change and Continuity in an Irish Monastic Foundation (6th- to 16th Century), 1995, Transaction Publishers, Rutgers – State University, USA. </ref> (recorded as holding the office in 1260).

References

Archdeacons of Clonmacnoise
13th-century Irish Roman Catholic priests